The 318th Special Operations Squadron flies the Pilatus PC-12 and is currently stationed at Cannon Air Force Base, New Mexico. The 318th is under the command of the Air Force Special Operations Command. Crews plan, prepare, and execute nonstandard aviation missions in support of joint special operations forces while directly supporting theater special operations commanders by conducting night vision infiltration, exfiltration, resupply and other combat taskings on unimproved runways.

History
The squadron was activated on 1 May 1944 as the 318th Troop Carrier Squadron (Commando) at Camp Mackall, North Carolina and serving under the 3d Air Commando Group. The unit participated in the Southwest Pacific Theater, flying the Waco CG-4 glider and C-47 Skytrain transport. The squadron was inactivated 25 March 1946. 

Reactivated on 15 November 1971 at Pope Air Force Base, North Carolina, the unit was stood up as the 318th Special Operations Squadron, serving under 1st Special Operations Wing. The unit's mission was to provide unconventional warfare support in Vietnam with the Lockheed C-130 Hercules until inactivation on 1 June 1974. 

The unit was most recently reactivated on 16 May 2008.  The unit replace a detachment that had operated the Pilatus PC-12 since 27 July 2007, first at Hurlburt Field, Florida as 1st Special Operations Group, Detachment 4, then after 30 December 2007 at Cannon Air Force Base, New Mexico as 27th Special Operations Group, Detachment 2.

Lineage
 Constituted as the 318th Troop Carrier Squadron, Commando on 1 May 1944 and activated
 Inactivated on 25 March 1946
 Redesignated 318th Special Operations Squadron on 21 October 1971
 Activated on 15 November 1971
 Inactivated on 1 June 1974
 Activated on 2 May 2008

Assignments
 3d Air Commando Group, 1 May 1944 – 25 March 1946.
 1st Special Operations Wing, 15 November 1971 – 1 June 1974
 27th Special Operations Group, 2 May 2008 – present

Stations
 Camp Mackall, North Carolina, 1 May 1944
 Dunnellon Army Air Field, Florida, 15 August 1944
 Camp Mackall, North Carolina, 12 September 1944
 Baer Field, Indiana, 30 September-ii October 1944
 Nadzab Airfield Complex, New Guinea, 26 October 1944;
 Leyte, Philippines, (undetermined location), 5 January 1945
 Mangaldan Airfield, Luzon, Philippines, 26 January 1945
 Laoag Airfield, Luzon, Philippines, 15 April 1945
 Ie Shima Airfield, Okinawa, 9 August 1945 (operated from Atsugi Airfield, Japan, 20 September-7 October 1945)
 Chitose Air Base, Japan, 27 October 1945 – 25 March 1946.
 Pope Air Force Base, North Carolina, 15 November 1971 – 1 June 1974
 Cannon Air Force Base, New Mexico, 2 May 2008 – present

Aircraft
 Waco CG-4, 1944
 Douglas C-47 Skytrain, 1944–1946
 Lockheed C-130 Hercules, 1971–1974
 PZL C-145A Skytruck, 2007–2013 
 Pilatus PC-12, 2007–present

References

 Notes

Bibliography

 
 
 

318